Thomas Hardeman Jr. (January 12, 1825 – March 6, 1891) was an American politician, lawyer and soldier.

Early years
Hardeman was born in Eatonton, Georgia and graduated from Emory College in 1845. He studied and was admitted to the state bar in 1847. Rather than practicing law, he pursued interests in the warehouse and commission business.

Political and military service
After serving in the Georgia House of Representatives  in 1853, 1855, and 1857, Hardeman was elected in 1858 as an Opposition Party candidate to the 36th United States Congress as a Representative of Georgia's 3rd congressional district and served a partial term from March 4, 1859, until January 23, 1861, when he resigned to become a captain in the Floyd Rifles.

During the American Civil War, Hardeman was major of the 2nd Georgia Battalion in the Confederate States Army. Later, he became a colonel in the 45th Georgia Infantry, a regiment he organized.

During the war, he served in the Georgia House of Representatives in 1863, 1864, and 1874. Hardeman served as the Speaker of the House from 1863 to 1865, and again in 1875–1877.

After the war, Hardeman was a  delegate to the 1872 Democratic National Convention. He was also president of the State convention and chairman of the Democratic State executive committee for four years. In 1882, Hardeman won the election again to the U.S. House of Representatives as an at-large Democrat to the 48th United States Congress. He served one term from March 4, 1883, to March 3, 1885.

Death
Thomas Hardeman Jr. died in Macon, Georgia, on March 6, 1891, and was buried in that city's Rose Hill Cemetery.  The Colonel Thomas Hardeman Jr. Chapter 2170 of the United Daughters of the Confederacy was named in his honor.  Hardeman Avenue in downtown Macon, Georgia, was also named for him.

See also
 List of speakers of the Georgia House of Representatives

References

External links
 Retrieved on 2008-10-19
 Letter from Thomas Hardeman, Macon, Georgia, to Robert Jemison, Jr., Tuscaloosa, Alabama, May 23, 1843
 

1825 births
1891 deaths
People from Eatonton, Georgia
Opposition Party members of the United States House of Representatives from Georgia (U.S. state)
Democratic Party members of the United States House of Representatives from Georgia (U.S. state)
Democratic Party members of the Georgia House of Representatives
Confederate States Army officers
People of Georgia (U.S. state) in the American Civil War
Georgia (U.S. state) lawyers
Emory University alumni
American slave owners
19th-century American politicians
Speakers of the Georgia House of Representatives
State political party chairs of Georgia (U.S. state)
19th-century American lawyers